The Feliks Dzerzhinskiy is a Valerian Kuybyshev-class (92-016, OL400) Soviet/Russian river cruise ship, cruising in the Volga basin. The ship was built by Slovenské Lodenice at their shipyard in Komárno, Czechoslovakia, and entered service in 1978. She was named after the Soviet statesman Felix Dzerzhinsky alias Iron Felix. At 3,935 tonnes, Feliks Dzerzhinskiy is one of the world's biggest river cruise ships. Her sister ships are Valerian Kuybyshev, Mikhail Frunze, Fyodor Shalyapin, Sergey Kuchkin, Mstislav Rostropovich, Aleksandr Suvorov, Semyon Budyonnyy and Georgiy Zhukov. Feliks Dzerzhinskiy is currently operated by Vodohod, a Russian river cruise line. Her home port is currently Nizhny Novgorod.

Features
The ship has two restaurants, two bars, solarium and resting area.

See also
 List of river cruise ships

References

External links

Теплоход "Феликс Дзержинский" 
Project 92-016 

1978 ships
River cruise ships
Ships built in Czechoslovakia